Vendsyssel is the northernmost traditional district of Denmark and of Jutland. Being divided from mainland Jutland by the Limfjord, it is technically a part of the North Jutlandic Island, but the name often used informally for the entire island. Vendsyssel is part of the North Denmark Region.

Vendsyssel neighbours Hanherred to the southwest and Himmerland to the south, across the Limfjord. Whether the island Læsø is also a part of Vendsyssel, is a matter of definition. The major towns of Vendsyssel are Hjørring, Frederikshavn, Brønderslev, Sæby, Hirtshals, Løkken, Nørresundby and, on its northern tip, Skagen. The dominating city is, however, Aalborg which is mainly situated outside Vendsyssel on the southern shore of the Limfjord with Nørresundby as a secondary, northern centre.

Etymology
Adam of Bremen (ca. 1075) calls Vendsyssel Wendila, Ælnoth (ca. 1100) calls it Wendel, the Icelandic literature Vendill. Derived from this is the ethnic name wændlar, Danish vendelboer, which is part of the name of the syssel. In the Danish Census Book (Kong Valdemars Jordebog, ca. 1231) Wændlesysæl, Wendelsysel, Wændil. Presumably originally the name of the Limfjord, then name of the region north of it. 

According to historians and linguists, the name Vendsyssel may be derived from the Germanic tribe of the Vandals. Syssel is an ancient form of administrative region. Vendel (Old Danish Wændil) was also the ancient name of the Limfjord itself.

Places of interest

 Hirtshals lighthouse
 North Sea Oceanarium
 Rubjerg Knude lighthouse
 Vendsyssel Historical Museum

Events
The largest classical music festival in Scandinavia is the Vendsyssel Festival in the summer.

Infrastructure
Vendsyssel is an important gatehead for transport from the European continent to Norway and Western Sweden. The European routes E39 and E45 cross the area as motorways. National route 11 connects Vendsyssel with Hanherred and Thy before crossing the Limfjord to western Jutland on the Oddesund Bridge. Danish national road 40 also passes through Vendsyssel.

Bridges
Vendsyssel is linked to mainland Jutland by bridges and a tunnel:
Limfjord Railroad Bridge (in Aalborg, linking Vendsyssel to the rail network)
Limfjord Bridge (road, linking Nørresundby to central Aalborg)
Limfjord Tunnel (motorway E45, east of Aalborg)
A further bridge crossing the Limfjord west of Aalborg (carrying the E39) has been proposed.

Railways
Skagen-Frederikshavn-Hjørring-Brønderslev-Aalborg, Nordjyske Jernbaner, single track, hourly Intercity trains. From Aalborg there are connections to Århus and Copenhagen
Hjørring-Hirtshals, local railway (and transit to Norway) operated by Nordjyske Jernbaner

Ferries
To Sweden:
Frederikshavn-Gothenburg (also for railway freight cars)

To Norway:
Hirtshals-Kristiansand (also for railway freight cars)
Hirtshals-Larvik
Hirtshals-Stavanger
Hirtshals-Bergen
Hirtshals-Oslo
Hirtshals-Langesund
Frederikshavn-Oslo

To mainland Jutland:
Hals-Egense (crossing the eastern mouth of the Limfjord)

To the island of Læsø:
Frederikshavn-Læsø

To the Faroe Islands:
Hirtshals-Tórshavn

Airports
Aalborg Airport (international)
Sindal Airport (currently no scheduled routes)

References

 
Traditional districts of Denmark
North Jutland Region